Bishen may refer to:

Bishen, Iran, a village in Hamadan Province, Iran
Bishen Bedi (born 1946), former Indian cricketer
A Hindi version of the name of the Hindu god Vishnu

See also
 Bishan (disambiguation)
 Bi Sheng (972–1051 AD), Chinese artisan and inventor